Jonathan Cristian Schunke (born 22 February 1987) is an Argentine footballer who plays as a centre-back.

References

External links
 
 
 

1987 births
Living people
Argentine footballers
Argentine expatriate footballers
Argentine people of German descent
Sportspeople from Misiones Province
Association football defenders
Guaraní Antonio Franco footballers
Real Arroyo Seco footballers
Estudiantes de La Plata footballers
Ferro Carril Oeste footballers
Club Almirante Brown footballers
Club Almagro players
Godoy Cruz Antonio Tomba footballers
Aldosivi footballers
Sportivo Luqueño players
Deportes Santa Cruz footballers
Argentine Primera División players
Paraguayan Primera División players
Primera B de Chile players
Argentine expatriate sportspeople in Paraguay
Argentine expatriate sportspeople in Chile
Expatriate footballers in Paraguay
Expatriate footballers in Chile